Malyadan (also Malyadaan; English: The Garlanding, also The Wedding Garland) is a 1971 Bengali film directed by Ajoy Kar, based on a short story by Rabindranath Tagore, and starring Soumitra Chatterjee, Sabitri Chatterjee and Nandini Maliya in the lead roles. Tagore's story tells a tragic tale of innocent love. At the 18th National Film Awards, the film won the National Film Award for Best Feature Film in Bengali.

Synopsis 
The story as well as the film take their title from the Indian custom of exchanging garlands as part of wedding rituals.

Jatin (Soumitra Chatterjee), a young doctor, visits his sister during his vacation. On his way, he glanced a girl adoring a rabbit. At home, Jatin is constantly nagged by his cousin Patal (Sabitri Chatterjee) to get married. She introduces him to a teenage girl, Kurani (Nandini Maliya), who happens to be the same girl Jatin previously came across. Kurani is an orphan who survived the famine and was rescued and cured by Patal and Harakumarbabu (Patal's husband) and since then is raised by this childless couple. Kurani is innocent and lacking in worldly senses. When Patal playfully asks her if she likes Jatin and if she will marry him, Kurani replies in the affirmative. Jatin is embarrassed and intends to keep himself away from this childliness. He refuses to accept a garland offered by Kurani and  becomes angry with Patal, who believes that there is nothing wrong, because Kurani is like a doe of the woods. Jatin leaves with a note to her sister, leaving behind the garland too. This leaves Kurani heartbroken and she breaks into deep tears. Patal is struck with remorse when she realises that Kurani has actually fallen in love with Jatin. Next morning, it is discovered that Kurani has disappeared, leaving behind all ornaments and dresses she has had and only with the garland of dry flowers with her. They search for Kurani in all likely places, but she is nowhere to be found. Subsequently, Jatin while working in his Plague hospital,  finds that Kurani  is admitted there as an unknown patient  in an extremely weak and emaciated condition. Jatin's heart feels the love finally and he caresses the girl. He takes her to his home and informs Patal. In the climax, Jatin confesses his love to Kurani and asks a dying Kurani to put her garland around his neck, in presence of Patal. Patal dresses Kurani as bride and Kurani's neverspoken dream comes true at least before her departure from this material world.

Cast 
 Soumitra Chatterjee as Jatin
Nandini Maliya as Kurani
 Sabitri Chatterjee as Patal
Sailen Gangopadhyay as Harakumarbabu
Bhanu Bannerjee as Dhana Malee
Gita Dey as Dhana's wife
Bikash Roy as Senior Doctor in hospital

Crew 
 Direction—Ajoy Kar
 Production—Ajoy Kar and Bimal Dey
 Music -- Hemanta Mukhopadhyay

Reception 
The film was well received when released, both commercially and critically. Apart from the National Award, it won two BFJA Awards. Subsequently. it seems to have been almost forgotten, although a track containing a Tagore song, sung by Hemanta Mukherjee, still endures.

The film must be remembered for its beautiful portrayal of the characters, a successful thematic representation of the essence of the story. This is evidently one of the best movie adaptions of Tagore stories. Though the dialogues which are taken from the story are kept in ditto without any necessary modifications needed to turn a written form into a colloquial form, but on the other hand the added and extended part, especially the portion of 'Dhana Malee and his wife' has been very compassionately drawn and very excellently presented by legendary actors  Bhanu Bandopadhyay and Gita Dey.

Sabitri Chatterjee, not only with her dialogues but altogether with her acting skill did proper justification to the role of Patal while Soumitra Chatterjee is perfect also as Jatin. But words need to be spoken about Nandini Maliya. Her large eyes, innocent looks and expressions are just too good and it never reminds one that Kurani actually has the least dialogues of all.

Hemanta Mukherjee's music creates the tone- romantic, haunting and melancholic. The 'dream sequence' should be perhaps one of the best dream sequences, which reminds of 'Chitrangada' and the associated background score is indeed a masterpiece. In two scenes, the character of Kurani merges with two other Tagore characters- 'Pupedidi' (where she feeds the rabbits the cauliflower-leaves) and 'Mini' (where she says to Dhana- 'tumi kicchu jano na').

Preservation 
Malyadan has been restored and digitised by the National Film Archives of India.

Awards 
 18th National Film Awards -- National Film Award for Best Feature Film in Bengali
 BFJA Awards 1972—Best Indian Films
 BFJA Awards 1972—Best Supporting Actress Sabitri Chatterjee

References

External links 

1971 films
Bengali-language Indian films
Films based on works by Rabindranath Tagore
Indian black-and-white films
Best Bengali Feature Film National Film Award winners
Films directed by Ajoy Kar
1970s Bengali-language films